Limacinae are a taxonomic subfamily of air-breathing land slugs, terrestrial pulmonate gastropod molluscs in the family Limacidae.

Taxonomy
The subfamily Limacinae is recognized in the taxonomy of Bouchet & Rocroi (2005)

Genera
Genera in the subfamily Limacinae include:

 Limax Linnaeus, 1758 - type genus of the family Limacidae
 subgenus Limacus Lehmann, 1864
 Bielzia Clessin, 1887 - with the only species Bielzia coerulans M. Bielz, 1851. Some authors, for example Russian malacologists, classify genus Bielzia within separate family Limacopsidae.
 Caspilimax P. Hesse, 1926
 Caucasolimax Likharev et Wiktor, 1980
 Gigantomilax O. Boettger, 1883
 Gigantomilax csikii Soós, 1924
 Gigantomilax lederi (Boettger, 1883)
 Gigantomilax majoricensis (Heynemann, 1863)
 Lehmannia Heynemann, 1862
 Limacopsis Simroth, 1888
 Malacolimax Malm, 1868
 Turcomilax Simroth, 1901

References

External links 

Slugs of Florida on the UF / IFAS Featured Creatures Web site